Krisha Kurup is an Indian actress who has appeared in Tamil, Telugu and Malayalam films.She has been seen in films including Azhagu Kutti Chellam (2016) and Goli Soda 2 (2018).

Career
Krisha Kurup was born into a Keralan family settled in Mumbai. After attending Swami Vivekanand International School, she chose to work on films.

Krisha's role in Anthony Charles's Azhagu Kutti Chellam (2016) won her further opportunities in Tamil cinema during 2017, with the actress quickly signing on to be a part of Anthony's next film Saalai (2017), Koottali (2018), Vijay Milton's Goli Soda 2 and Suseenthiran's delayed Angelina, where she portrayed the title role.

In 2022, she was seen in the bilingual sports drama Clap and the drama Jothi.

Filmography
Films

References

External links 
 

Indian film actresses
Tamil actresses
Living people
Actresses in Tamil cinema
21st-century Indian actresses
Year of birth missing (living people)